EYC may refer to:

Government and politics 
 Education, Youth, Culture and Sport Council of the Council of the European Union
 European Young Conservatives
 European Youth Campaign, a defunct operation of the United States Central Intelligence Agency
 European Youth Centres housing the Council of Europe

Yacht clubs 
 Edgartown Yacht Club, in Massachusetts
 Edgewood Yacht Club, in Rhode Island
 Erie Yacht Club, in Pennsylvania
 Eugene Yacht Club, in Oregon

Other uses 
 E.Y.C. (band), an American pop/R&B group
 East Yorkshire Carnegie F.C., an English football club
 Ecology Youth Corps, an American environmental organization
 Edinburgh Youth Choir, in Scotland
 Episcopal Youth Community of the Episcopal Church in the United States of America
 European Youth Capital